The Nabi Yahya Mosque, literally the Mosque of the Prophet John, is a mosque containing the traditional tomb of John the Baptist. The mosque also contains the tombs of Elisha and Obadiah, prophets who were buried next to John the Baptist.

It is the main mosque in the Palestinian village of Sebastia, near Nablus. It is located in the central square of the village. It is constructed of large buttressed walls. Within its courtyard, a stairway in the small domed building leads down into a cave.

History

Byzantine church
The Nabi Yahya Mosque stands on the site identified since Byzantine times as the place where John the Baptist's body was buried by his followers. Matthew 14:12 records that "his disciples came and took away [John's] body and buried it". A church was erected on the spot of the tomb during the Byzantine era.

Crusader cathedral

The church erected above John the Baptist's tomb was superseded by a Crusader-built church in 1160. It was transformed into a mosque by Saladin in 1187, although some sources say it was converted by the Mamluks in 1261. Nabi Yahya refers to John the Baptist in the Arabic language.

In 1870, the  French explorer Victor Guérin visited the place, and noted:

Later, in the 1870s, the Palestine Exploration Fund excavated the place, which it described in its Survey of Western Palestine as "a mere shell, the greater part of the roof and aisle piers gone, and over the crypt a modern kubbeh has been built. The interior length is 158 feet, the breadth 74 feet; the west wall is 10 feet thick, the north wall 8 feet, the south wall 4 feet. There were six bays, of which the second from the east is larger, probably once supporting a dome. On the east are three apses to nave and aisles, the central apse is 30 feet in diameter, equal to the width of the nave. The piers had four columns attached, one each side; on the west was a doorway and two windows; on the south four windows remain, and on the north three."

Ottoman rebuilding

In 1892, Abdul Hamid II ordered the rebuilding of part of the site. The mosque was restored and mostly rebuilt during the 19th century while Palestine was under Ottoman rule.

Prison of John the Baptist

References

Further reading

External links

Photos of the Nabi Yahya Mosque at the Manar al-Athar photo archive
Buildings and structures completed in 1160
12th-century churches
13th-century mosques
19th-century mosques
Mosques in the West Bank
Christian pilgrimages
John the Baptist
Mosques converted from churches by the Ayyubid dynasty
Ayyubid architecture in the State of Palestine